The Ventnor West Branch was the final addition to the Isle of Wight railway network, and used an earlier scheme to run a railway from Shanklin to the railwayless south-west part of the island.

History 
The branch was opened by the Newport, Godshill & St Lawrence Railway between Merstone and St. Lawrence on 20 July 1897. From the day of opening, the branch was operated by the Isle of Wight Central Railway. A temporary terminus was provided at St Lawrence until the extension was opened to Ventnor Town on 1 June 1900. The terminus was renamed Ventnor West by the Southern Railway.

In the days prior to the Grouping of the railways in 1923, the line struggled to make financial ends meet. However, after 1923 the services did improve and some of the increasing competition from road transport was lessened. An extensive programme of modernisation was undertaken by the Southern Railway, albeit with secondhand equipment from the mainland. Some economies were made on the branch by the Southern Railway, most notably the removal of the passing loop and signal box at Whitwell in 1928. The footbridge at Dean level crossing on the outskirts of Whitwell was also removed around this time. The footbridge was re-erected at Wroxall.

Nationalisation in 1948 brought the British Railways emblem to the locomotives but few other significant operational changes. The passenger numbers remained low and the branch continued to lose revenue to more convenient bus services. It was no surprise when closure was announced for 15 September 1952. The branch was visited by a large number of enthusiasts in its final months.

Today all the station buildings are in residential use.

The route described 

From the junction at Merstone, the line turned south and continued through farmland to cross the main Newport-Shanklin road. The line then continued through farmland to Godshill.

From Godshill the line again traversed farmland on a large stretch of embankment that ran to the small hamlet of Southford on the outskirts of Whitwell.

From Whitwell the line climbed up to the northern portal of St. Lawrence tunnel, crossing the B3327 road at Dean level crossing before reaching the tunnel itself.

The line entered the tunnel and began a long descent to St Lawrence and the terminus at Ventnor West.

Stations 

 Merstone
 Godshill
 Whitwell
 St Lawrence
 Ventnor West

Notes

Bibliography

Further reading

Closed railway lines in South East England
Railway lines opened in 1897
Railway lines closed in 1952